Jakubowo may refer to the following places:
Jakubowo, Kuyavian-Pomeranian Voivodeship (north-central Poland)
Jakubowo, Sępólno County in Kuyavian-Pomeranian Voivodeship (north-central Poland)
Jakubowo, Podlaskie Voivodeship (north-east Poland)
Jakubowo, Szamotuły County in Greater Poland Voivodeship (west-central Poland)
Jakubowo, Wągrowiec County in Greater Poland Voivodeship (west-central Poland)
Jakubowo, Chojnice County in Pomeranian Voivodeship (north Poland)
Jakubowo, Kwidzyn County in Pomeranian Voivodeship (north Poland)
Jakubowo, Mrągowo County in Warmian-Masurian Voivodeship (north Poland)
Jakubowo, Ostróda County in Warmian-Masurian Voivodeship (north Poland)